Sault-au-Cochon is an unorganized territory in the Capitale-Nationale region of Quebec, Canada, in the La Côte-de-Beaupré Regional County Municipality. It is an unpopulated and undeveloped stretch of shoreline along the Saint Lawrence River that encompasses the promontory from Cape Tourmente to Petite-Rivière-Saint-François.

History
The Charlevoix Railway passes through the territory right along the Saint Lawrence River. The stop is situated the mouth of a small stream that rushes down the steep slope of the promontory. In 1676 it was reported that the stream used to be called Gouffre ("Chasm") River but had been given the name Sault au Cochon since. This name comes from the presence of Porpoise and Beluga whale in the Saint Lawrence River that were formerly called cochons de mer ("sea pigs") in French. The name "Saut au Cochon" was used by Jean Deshayes on his map of 1695, and it was thereafter also applied to the surrounding interior lands that were not part of the seigneurial domain of the Quebec Seminary.

The territory has been used for logging and it was home to a sawmill in the 1930s.

Canadian Pacific Air Lines Flight 108

On September 9, 1949, a Canadian Pacific Air Lines DC-3, en route from L'Ancienne-Lorette to Baie-Comeau, exploded and crashed at Sault-au-Cochon, killing 23 persons (19 passengers and 4 crew members). It was the result of a homemade bomb made by Genereux Ruest, a watchmaker in Quebec who had placed it on board with the help of his sister Marguerite Ruest Pitre. The plot was hatched by one Albert Guay, a jeweler in Quebec who wanted to get rid of his wife Rita ( Morel), one of the passengers, and cash-in an insurance policy worth CAD$10,000 ($ today). All three were found guilty and hanged in the early 1950s.

Demographics
Population trend:
 Population in 2016: 0
 Population in 2011: 0
 Population in 2006: 0
 Population in 2001: 0
 Population in 1996: 0
 Population in 1991: 0

See also
 List of unorganized territories in Quebec

References

External links

Unorganized territories in Capitale-Nationale